Elections to Argyll and Bute Council were held on 3 May 2012 on the same day as the 31 other local authorities in Scotland. The election used the eleven wards created under the Local Governance (Scotland) Act 2004, with 36 councillors being elected. Each ward elected either 3 or 4 members, using the STV electoral system.

After the 2007 Local Election a coalition was formed between the Alliance for Independents group and the Scottish National Party. This arrangement subsequently broke up and the Independent group formed a minority administration with the support of the Scottish Liberal Democrats.

The 2012 election saw Independent Councillors remain the largest grouping on the Council while the Scottish National Party increased their representation again by 3 seats, chiefly at the expense of the Lib Dems. The Scottish Conservative and Unionist Party gained an additional seat and replaced the Lib Dems in third place according to vote share.

Following the election an administration was formed between the Scottish National Party and the Argyll First Group of Independent Councilors. However, this coalition subsequently broke down, and after the SNP National Executive prevented the SNP group forming a coalition with the Scottish Conservatives and Liberal Democrats, 4 members of the SNP group including Roddy McCuish, Mary Jean Devon, Michael Breslin and Robert MacIntyre left the SNP, and a coalition of Independents, Scottish Conservatives, and Liberal Democrats was subsequently formed in October 2013, led by Dick Walsh. Another member of the SNP Group, Fred Hall, had previously left the SNP in April 2013, and now sits as an independent.

Election result

Note: "Votes" are the first preference votes. The net gain/loss and percentage changes relate to the result of the previous Scottish local elections on 3 May 2007. This may differ from other published sources showing gain/loss relative to seats held at dissolution of Scotland's councils.

Ward results

South Kintyre
2007: 1xCon; 1xSNP; 1xLib Dem
2012: 1xCon; 1xLib Dem; 1xSNP
2007-2012 Change: No change

Kintyre and the Islands
2007: 1xLib Dem; 1xIndependent; 1xSNP
2012: 1xSNP; 1xIndependent; 1xLib Dem
2007-2012 Change: No change

Mid Argyll
2007: 2xIndependent; 1xLib Dem
2012: 2xIndependent; 1xSNP
2007-2012 Change: SNP gain one seat  from Lib Dem

Oban South and the Isles
2007: 2xSNP; 1xLib Dem; 1xIndependent
2012: 3xSNP; 1xIndependent
2007-2012 Change: SNP gain one seat from Lib Dem

Oban North and Lorn
2007: 2xIndependent; 1xLib Dem; 1xSNP
2012: 3xIndependent; 1xSNP
2007-2012 Change: Independent gain one seat from Lib Dem

Cowal
2007: 2xIndependent; 1xSNP
2012: 2xIndependent; 1xSNP
2007-2012 Change: No change

Dunoon
2007: 2xIndependent; 1xSNP
2012: 2xIndependent; 1xSNP
2007-2012 Change: No change

 

 Elections to the Dunoon Ward were suspended following the death of SNP candidate Alister MacAlister. Polling took place on 10 May 2012.

Isle of Bute
2007: 2xSNP; 1xIndependent
2012: 2xSNP; 1xIndependent
2007-2012 Change: No change

Lomond North
2007: 3xIndependent
2012: 2xIndependent; 1xCon
2007-2012 Change: Con gain one seat from Independent

Helensburgh Central
2007: 1xCon; 1xSNP; 1xLib Dem; 1xIndependent
2012: 1xIndependent; 1xSNP; 1xCon; 1xLib Dem
2007-2012 Change: No change

Helensburgh and Lomond South
2007: 1xCon; 1xLib Dem; 1xIndependent
2012: 1xLib Dem; 1xSNP; 1xCon
2007-2012 Change: SNP gain one seat from Independent

Changes since 2012
† Independent Oban South and the Isles Cllr Fred Hall resigned his seat on 14 March 2014. A by-election was held on 23 May 2014 and was won by the Labour Party's Neil MacIntyre.
†† SNP Oban North and Lorn Cllr Louise Glen-Lee resigned on 30 April 2014 for personal reasons. A by-election was held on 17 July 2014 and was won by the Independent John MacGregor.
††† Independent Oban North and Lorn Cllr John MacGregor died on 28 July 2014. A by-election was held to fill the vacancy and was won by the SNP's Iain MacLean on 23 October 2014. He resigned from the SNP and became an Independent on 15 March 2016.
†††† SNP South Kintyre Cllr John Semple resigned on 19 September 2014 for personal reasons.  A by-election was held to fill the vacancy on 11 December 2014 and was won by the SNP's John Armour. 
††††† Independent Oban North and Lorn Cllr Iain Angus MacDonald joined the SNP and ceased to be an Independent on 24 September 2014. He resigned his seat on 11 March 2016. The by-election was held on 2 June 2016 and was won by the Independent Kieron Green
†††††† Independent Oban North and Lorn Cllr Duncan McIntyre resigned due to ill health in December 2015. A by-election was held to fill the vacancy on 18 February 2016 which was won by the SNP's Julie McKenzie.

By-elections

References

External links
http://www.argyll-bute.gov.uk/elections/results2012
http://www.andrewteale.me.uk/pdf/2012/argyll-bute12.pdf

2012
2012 Scottish local elections